Surjit Singh (born 3 April 1989) is an Indian professional footballer who plays as a defender for Salgaocar F.C.

Career
He played also for JCT FC and during the 2003/2004 Season on loan by Mohammedan S.C. He than returned in June 2004 from Mohammedan to JCT FC. Singh played a year after his return with JCT and moved in Summer 2006 to Punjab State Super League side Border Security Force. After five years left the  Punjab State Super League club Border Security Force and signed for Mohun Bagan A.C.

Salgaocar
Singh made his professional debut for Salgaocar in the I-League on 19 October 2013 against Mumbai at the Balewadi Sports Complex; in which he came on as a substitute for Rahul Kumar in the 80th minute; as Salgaocar won the match 1–3.

Career statistics

Honour

Goa lusophony 
2014 Lusophony Games (1)

References

External links 
 Goal Profile

1989 births
Living people
Indian footballers
Salgaocar FC players
Association football defenders
I-League players